is a former Japanese football player.

Playing career
Kageyama was born in Osaka on May 27, 1977. After graduating from high school, he joined the J1 League club Sanfrecce Hiroshima in 1996. On March 16, he debuted against JEF United Ichihara in the opening match and he played as left back of a three-back defense for four matches in a row. However he could did not play at all after that. In 1997, he played in only one match. He left the club at the end of the 1997 season and entered Hannan University in 1998. In 2001, he joined his local club, Cerezo Osaka. However he did not play in any matches. In 2002, he moved to the newly promoted Japan Football League club, Sagawa Express Osaka (later Sagawa Shiga). He played often and became a regular player in 2005. The club won the championship in 2007. He retired at the end of the 2008 season.

Club statistics

References

External links

biglobe.ne.jp

1977 births
Living people
Hannan University alumni
Association football people from Osaka Prefecture
Sportspeople from Osaka
Japanese footballers
J1 League players
Japan Football League players
Sanfrecce Hiroshima players
Cerezo Osaka players
Sagawa Shiga FC players
Association football defenders